Philip Richard Erenberg (March 16, 1909 – February 2, 1992) was an American gymnast and Olympic silver medalist.

Personal life
Born in the Russian Empire, Erenberg was Jewish.  He arrived in the United States at the age of three. He had one brother and one sister. His father worked at the Florsheim Shoe Company.  His family lived in the Humboldt Park neighborhood of Chicago, Illinois. In 1923 the family moved to Los Angeles, and he attended Roosevelt High School.

He attended UCLA.  Erenberg received a medical degree from the University of California, Irvine School of Medicine in 1934. He practiced obstetrics and then internal medicine in Los Angeles. He had a daughter and a son.

Clubs
Erenberg was given a membership in and competed for the Los Angeles Athletic Club.

He competed at the 1932 Summer Olympics in Los Angeles, where Erenberg received a silver medal in gymnastics in clubs.

In 2010 Erenberg was inducted into the Southern California Jewish Sports Hall of Fame.

See also
List of select Jewish gymnasts

References

1909 births
1992 deaths
American male artistic gymnasts
Gymnasts at the 1932 Summer Olympics
Olympic silver medalists for the United States in gymnastics
Medalists at the 1932 Summer Olympics
American people of Ukrainian-Jewish descent
Jewish Ukrainian sportspeople
Emigrants from the Russian Empire to the United States
Jews and Judaism in Chicago
Sportspeople from Chicago
Gymnasts from Los Angeles
UCLA Bruins men's gymnasts
University of California, Irvine alumni
American obstetricians
American internists